Abundance may refer to:

In science and technology
 Abundance (economics), the opposite of scarcities
 Abundance (ecology), the relative representation of a species in a community
 Abundance (programming language), a Forth-like computer programming language
 Abundance and abundancy index are related but distinct notions in mathematics, see abundant number
 In chemistry:
 Abundance (chemistry), when a substance in a reaction is present in high quantities
 Abundance of the chemical elements, a measure of how common elements are
 Natural abundance, the natural prevalence of different isotopes of an element on Earth
 Abundance of elements in Earth's crust

In literature
Abundance (novel), a 2021 novel by Jakob Guanzon
 Abundance (play), a 1990 stage play written by Beth Henley
 Al-Kawthar ("Abundance"), the 108th sura of the Qur'an
 Abundance: The Future Is Better Than You Think, a 2012 book by Peter Diamandis and Steven Kotler

Other uses
 Abundance Generation, a renewable energy investment platform
 Fountain de la Abundancia, a former fountain in Madrid
 Abundance, Royal Abundance and Abundance Declared, bids in the card game Solo whist; sometimes spelled "abondance"

See also
 Abondance (disambiguation)
 Abundant life (disambiguation)
 Abundantia, a Roman goddess